Anabel Medina Garrigues and Alicja Rosolska were the defending champions but Medina Garrigues decided to participate at the Estoril Open instead.
Rosolska partnered up with Akgul Amanmuradova, but they lost in the first round to Katalin Marosi and Anna Tatishvili.
Janette Husárová and Magdaléna Rybáriková won the final over Eva Birnerová and Michaëlla Krajicek 6–4, 6–2.

Seeds

Draw

Draw

References
 Main Draw

Budapest Grand Prix - Doubles
2012 Doubles